Lisdowney GAA is a Gaelic Athletic Association club located in Lisdowney, County Kilkenny, Ireland. The club was founded in 1939, and is primarily concerned with hurling and camogie. The crest of Lisdowney GAA has a raven on a background of blue and white hoops. There is a raven mounted as a monument in the village centre.

Achievements
 All-Ireland Senior Club Camogie Championship (1): 1994
 Kilkenny Intermediate Hurling Championship (1): 2020
 Kilkenny Junior Hurling Championship (2): 1960, 2013
 Leinster Junior Club Hurling Championship (0): (runner-up in 2013)
 Kilkenny Junior Football Championship (1): 2017

Notable players
 Ted Carroll
 Angela Downey
 Ann Downey

References

External links
 Lisdowney GAA website

Gaelic games clubs in County Kilkenny
Hurling clubs in County Kilkenny
1939 establishments in Ireland